Macromia irata is a species of dragonfly in the family Macromiidae. It is endemic to Western Ghats in India.

Description and habitat
It is a medium sized dragonfly with emerald-green eyes. Its thorax is dark green metallic on dorsum, dark reddish-brown at sides, marked with citron-yellow. There is humeral stripe, an oblique narrow stripe on mesepimeron, and another stripe on the posterior border of metepimeron. Abdomen is black, marked with citron-yellow. Segment 2 has a pair of mid-dorsal diamond-shaped spots narrowly separated in the middle. The ventral border of this segment is broadly yellow at base. Segment 3 has a pair of mid-dorsal triangular spots at the basal side of jugal suture and a large triangular spot on each side at base. Segments 4 to 6 have the paired mid-dorsal spots. Segment 7 has the basal third to half yellow. Segment 8 has a narrow basal annule. Segments 9 and 10 are unmarked. Anal appendages are black.

It is usually found soaring over forest roads near streams.

It can be distinguished from other Macromia species by a characteristic twin diamond-shaped saddle-marking on segment 2.

See also
 List of odonates of India
 List of odonata of Kerala

References

Macromiidae
Taxa named by Frederic Charles Fraser
Odonata of Asia
Insects of India
Endemic fauna of the Western Ghats
Insects described in 1924